Chestnut Hills may refer to:

Chestnut Hills (Massachusetts)
Chestnut Hill, Ashe County, North Carolina
Chestnut Hill, Henderson County, North Carolina
Chestnut Hill Township, Ashe County, North Carolina